Richard Newman (born March 25, 1966) is an American poet and former long-time editor of River Styx. He is the author of three full-length poetry collections--All the Wasted Beauty of the World (Able Muse, 2014), Domestic Fugues (Steel Toe Books, 2009), and Borrowed Towns (Word Press, 2005)--and one novel, Graveyard of the Gods (Amphorae Press, 2016).

Biography
Richard Newman was born in Illinois, raised in southern Indiana, a longtime resident of St. Louis, and is now living in Ifrane, Morocco. He is the author of the poetry collections All the Wasted Beauty of the World (Able Muse, 2014), Domestic Fugues (Steel Toe Books, 2009), and Borrowed Towns (Word Press, 2005); the novel Graveyard of the Gods (Amphorae Press, 2016); and four poetry chapbooks: 24 Tall Boys: Dark Verse for Light Times (Snark Publishing/Firecracker Press, 2007), Monster Gallery: 19 Terrifying and Amazing Monster Sonnets! (Snark Publishing, 2005), Tastes Like Chicken and Other Meditations (Snark Publishing, 2004), and Greatest Hits (Pudding House Press, 2001). He is also an acclaimed songwriter.

His work has appeared in Best American Poetry 2006 (edited by Billy Collins), Ted Kooser's American Life in Poetry, Garrison Keillor's Writer's Almanac, Boulevard, Crab Orchard Review, The Ledge (as winner of The Ledge 2010 Poetry Competition), New Letters, (where he won the 2006 Reader's Choice Award), Poetry Daily, The Sun, Tar River Poetry, Verse Daily, and many other periodicals and anthologies. He was awarded a Regional Arts Commission Individual Artist Fellowship in 2013.

Newman earned his MFA at the Brief-Residency Writing Program at Spalding University. He has taught at Washington University in St. Louis, UMSL Honors College, and College of Marshall Islands. He currently teaches at Al Akhawayn University in Morocco.

Newman served as editor of River Styx from 1994 to 2016. He is a member of The CharFlies, a junk-folk band based in St. Louis, Missouri. The band is on temporary hiatus.

Excerpt from Borrowed Towns
Coins

My change: a nickel caked with finger grime;
two nicked quarters not long for this life, worth
more for keeping dead eyes shut than bus fare;
a dime, shining in sunshine like a new dime;
grubby pennies, one stamped the year of my birth,
no brighter than I from 40 years of wear.

What purses, piggy-banks, and window sills
have these coins known, their presidential heads
pinched into what beggar's chalky palm--
they circulate like tarnished red blood cells,
all of us exchanging the merest film
of our lives, and the lives of those long dead.

And now my turn in the convenience store,
I hand over my fist of change, still warm,
to the bored, lip-pierced check-out girl, once more
to be spun down cigarette machines, hurled
in fountains, flipped for luck--these dirty charms
chiming in the dark pockets of the world.

External links
River Styx
Poetry Foundation
Inaugural Poet Richard Blanco discusses humor in poetry and reads Newman's "Bless Their Hearts"
Review of All the Wasted Beauty of the World
Another Review of All the Wasted Beauty of the World
Q&A regarding his novel, Graveyard of the Gods
Review of Graveyard of the Gods
Another review of Graveyard of the Gods
Interview in St. Louis Post-Dispatch
How A Poem Happens interview
Newman named Best Local Poet in St. Louis by the Riverfront Times
Feature article on Newman's work at River Styx 
Newman on National Poetry Month with a Poet-a-Day

References

1966 births
Living people
Spalding University alumni
21st-century American poets
Writers from St. Louis
Poets from Missouri
Washington University in St. Louis faculty
University of Missouri–St. Louis faculty
Academic staff of Al Akhawayn University